Arhopala auxesia  is a butterfly in the family Lycaenidae. It was described by William Chapman Hewitson in 1863. It is found in  New Guinea and Sumatra.

Subspecies
A. a. auxesia (New Guinea, Sumatra)
A. a. salvia (Evans, 1957) (Salawati, Noemfoor Island)

References

External links
"Arhopala Boisduval, 1832" at Markku Savela's Lepidoptera and Some Other Life Forms 

Arhopala
Butterflies described in 1863
Butterflies of Oceania
Butterflies of Indonesia
Taxa named by William Chapman Hewitson